Fox's Feud is the third book of The Animals of Farthing Wood series.  It was first published in 1982 and has since been included in a single book with both The Fox Cub Bold and In the Grip of Winter and in the "Omnibus" edition (Hutchinson, 1994).

Plot

Summary

Following the losses of the harsh winter in White Deer Park, the animals face a new danger when they are treated with hostility by many of the Park's residents, including the territorial fox, Scarface.

Detailed

The book begins with the birth of Vixen's four cubs: Bold, Friendly, Charmer and Dreamer. Shortly afterwards an old scar faced fox, who is referred to as Scarface, approaches them. He tell them that his family has lived on this land since before it became a nature reserve and he does not like foxes from outside. Later Scarface watches Fox and Vixen training their cubs to hunt. Annoyed by how competent Bold is, Scarface attacks them and tries to kill Bold, but is beaten back by Bold and Vixen while the other cubs run away. Though Scarface is forced to retreat, Dreamer is later found dead, her body having been brutally mauled, and Fox has no doubt that Scarface was the culprit.

Fox and Vixen then accompany their cubs at all times while they hunt, but Bold resents this and demands greater freedom. Upon being granted this freedom he leaves the part of White Deer Park where the Farthing Wood animals live, despite his father telling him to not leave this area. While exploring he meets Adder who warns him that Scarface patrols this area; then Ranger, one of Scarface's sons and Scarface then suddenly appear and attack Bold. Though Bold evades Scarface and Ranger, Scarface calls upon a dozen nearby foxes who encircle Bold.

Adder tells Hare that Bold has been captured, and Hare informs Fox and Vixen. Fox then calls the Farthing Wood animals together and everyone heads off together to rescue Bold. Fox, Vixen, Friendly, and Charmer go on ahead to face Scarface while the other animals remain behind. Bold then suddenly appears and tell everyone that he was able to escape from Scarface's foxes by tricking one of the guards and outrunning the rest. When told by Kestrel that Fox is trying to rescue him Bold regrets his rash actions. The animals head towards Fox and find that the Great White Stag is mediating the conflict between Fox and Scarface, resolving it without any fighting. The animals later realise that Adder asked the Great White Stag to be the mediator.

Later, Scarface kills Hare's mate, and Fox decides that Scarface has to be killed. As Scarface is the main threat and has no successor Fox is confident that killing Scarface will cause their problems to end. While Fox wants Adder to kill Scarface he knows that asking Adder directly will not work, so he has Bold and Friendly go and hint to Adder that killing Scarface is vital for everyone's safety. However Bold is not cunning enough to fool Adder and after mentioning that Hare's mate has been killed Adder promises to 'even the score'. Adder then poisons one of Ranger's cousins and returns to Fox only to learn that Fox wanted him to kill Scarface. Fox is angry with Bold for not passing on the message correctly, but Adder does accept part of the blame so Bold is not punished so harshly.

Fox has his family, Badger, Tawny Owl, and Weasel act as guards during the night; while Scarface decides to hunt down the snake that killed his relative. Charmer and Ranger meet one night and start to fall in love. Friendly learns of this but decides not to tell anyone else. Meanwhile, Adder decides to hide and wait for Scarface, however due to the cold weather he has to leave his shelter and bask in the sunlight. Ranger spots Adder and tells his father. Scarface sneaks up on Adder and tries to kill him but only manages to bite off the end of Adder's tail. Adder retreats down a hole and waits for Scarface to leave. Scarface tries to determine whether Adder was the one that killed one of his foxes, but Adder refuses to tell him so he leaves. Due to being maimed Adder is annoyed with himself for helping Fox and plots revenge against Scarface. Meanwhile, Charmer is put on guard duty and fails to meet Ranger. Ranger finds her, but they are discovered by Bold. This causes Fox and Vixen to find out about Ranger and Charmer's relationship and Fox and Bold oppose it.

After his failure to kill Adder, Scarface decides to launch an attack on the Farthing Wood animals with a dozen foxes. Ranger goes to warn the Farthing Wood animals but runs into Scarface who is testing the lie of the land. Thinking this is why Ranger is here Scarface praises him and they go hunting together. Ranger tries to persuade Scarface to call off the attack, but this annoys Scarface and he calls Ranger a coward. The next day Scarface's group of foxes is seen by Kestrel who informs the other animals. The hares hide in the rabbits' warren, the squirrels hide in trees, and the rest of the animals hide in Badger's set. Finding the woods empty and seeing Kestrel overhead Scarface realise that the animals have been warned and has Ranger track them down. Ranger follows the scent of Charmer, then leads the rest of the foxes in the wrong direction so they lose the scent. Unfortunately, Mole thinks the foxes are his friends and tunnels upwards to see what is happening. Fortunately he is able to retreat before the foxes can eat him.

After much searching, Ranger finds and enters the set where the animals are hiding but plans to tell his father than this set is empty. This impresses Fox, but unfortunately Scarface knows they are in the set and demand they come out or be starved to death. Fox emerges from the set and challenges Scarface to single combat, which Scarface accepts. Though Scarface puts up a fierce fight, Fox eventually gets the upper hand and severely injures him, but lets him live. When the Warden suddenly arrives all the foxes flee. As a result of his defeat, the other foxes will no longer follow Scarface.

When Scarface has regained his strength, he makes a solo raid on Farthing Wood territory, killing most of the voles and fieldmice, four rabbits, and a single squirrel. In the morning, Fox regrets not killing Scarface and decides to tell the Great Stag what has happened. Whistler then points out that because the animals have tried to build a new Farthing Wood in the park this has caused them to be isolated from the other animals. He recommends that like him the other animals should choose a mate from the animals in White Deer Park. Meanwhile, Scarface takes a drink from a stream, but Adder ambushes him, and bites him in the leg, releasing all of his venom into him. Scarface dies, and Adder later tells his friends about his triumph. After celebrating, the animals of Farthing Wood decide to try to find mates among the inhabitants of White Deer Park.

Bold then leaves the reserve to seek out new adventures. Ranger finds his older brother Blaze and his mother trying to hunt down the snake that killed Scarface. To protect Adder Ranger claims that he killed it, then he and Charmer leave to build a new earth. Friendly tries to convince Russet, one of Scarface's relatives, to be his mate. Mole falls in love with a female mole called Mateless, who Badger renames Mirthful. Weasel, Kestrel, Hare, and Leveret (Hare's son) also find mates. However, Tawny Owl and Badger remain bachelors.

Characters in Fox's Feud

Television series
The events of this book are covered in the second half of the second season of The Animals of Farthing Wood (TV series), though the sequence of events is changed slightly. The main difference are that Mole survives the winter, Badger does not die, and Bold does not leave White Deer Park until after Scarface is defeated.

See also

1982 British novels
1982 fantasy novels
Animals of Farthing Wood books
Children's fantasy novels
1982 children's books
Hutchinson (publisher) books